Graham Michael Bensinger (born August 17, 1986) is an American journalist and entrepreneur known for his eponymous show In Depth with Graham Bensinger. Bensinger is known for interviewing a number of personalities in American sports, and won an Emmy for an interview he did with Mike Tyson.

Early life and education
Graham Bensinger was born and raised in St. Louis, Missouri. While attending Mary Institute and St. Louis Country Day School (MICDS), Graham launched his career with an internet-based sports radio station he developed in 8th grade. He also began buying time on St. Louis AM radio to talk sports. In 2003, his show began airing on Sporting News Radio's St. Louis station, and moved to ESPN Radio's St. Louis station the following year. In November 2005 at the age of 19, Bensinger secured an interview with Terrell Owens that led to his suspension from the Philadelphia Eagles for the final nine games of the NFL season. Bensinger was also granted interviews with O. J. Simpson in February 2004 and July 2005. The Graham Bensinger Show aired on SIRIUS Satellite Radio for multiple years.

Bensinger began studying broadcast journalism at Syracuse University's S.I. Newhouse School of Public Communications, but left midway through his second year to pursue broadcasting full-time.

Career

During his junior year of high school, Bensinger interviewed O. J. Simpson. He set up a video camera, and the footage ended up on Good Morning America. Bensinger was subsequently interviewed by Diane Sawyer, in addition to appearing on cable outlets.

A year after the O. J. Simpson interview, Bensinger began writing for ESPN's website. Following his senior year of high school, he sat with Simpson again, and was able to sell the interview to ESPN as part of their E-Ticket series. This started a three-and-a-half year long relationship between Bensinger and ESPN, with Bensinger continuing to write, appear on television, podcast and work as an ESPNU sideline reporter.

In 2009, Bensinger began partnering with NBCSports.com on a long-form video interview program, portions of which would air on NBC TV platforms.

After freelancing as a long-form interviewer for ESPN and NBC Sports, Bensinger debuted his own show in the fall of 2010. The first two seasons of In Depth with Graham Bensinger were a one-man operation where he handled all aspects of business and production himself. Bensinger staffed up for season three and expanded to over-the-air network syndication at the start of his show's fourth season, airing on ABC, NBC, CBS and FOX affiliates across the U.S, and the show is now run by a crew of ten. Previously, the show aired solely on regional sports networks.

In Depth with Graham Bensinger is now in its 11th season (2021), which began with Bensinger taking a trip to India to speak with cricketer Virat Kohli. According to the show's website, it reaches 3 million broadcast viewers, and 2.5 million digital views per episode, on average. Nielsen has calculated that the show averages 1.5 million weekly viewers. Internationally, the show airs via ESPN International, BT Sport, FOX Sports International, in-flight on Emirates, across 170 countries and territories on American Forces Network and digitally on Bensinger's YouTube channel.

The show's corporate sponsors included JPMorgan Chase, Toyota, AT&T, Pepsi, Mars, MillerCoors and GMC.

Awards
In Depth with Graham Bensinger won an Emmy Award for Graham's interview with Mike Tyson at his Las Vegas home.

References 

1986 births
Living people
American television talk show hosts
Golf writers and broadcasters
S.I. Newhouse School of Public Communications alumni
Writers from St. Louis